Kamila Gafarova (born 15 August 2007) is an Azerbaijani rhythmic gymnast.  She is the  2022 European junior clubs bronze medalist.

Career 
Kamila entered the national team in 2022, se debuted at the Irina Cup in Warsaw winning the non FGI junior All-Around. She then won All-Around silver at the Baku Championships and was selected for the European Championships in Tel Aviv along Madina Damirova, Alina Mammadova, Kamilla Seyidzade, seniors Zohra Aghamirova and Arzu Jalilova and the senior group. She competed with hoop and clubs, qualifying for both finals and ending 6th with hoop and winning bronze in the final with clubs.

References 

Living people
2007 births
Azerbaijani rhythmic gymnasts
Sportspeople from Baku
Medalists at the Rhythmic Gymnastics European Championships
21st-century Azerbaijani women